Hancock's blenny (Acanthemblemaria hancocki) is a species of chaenopsid blenny found in coral reefs around Costa Rica and Panama, in the eastern central Pacific ocean. and can reach a maximum length of  TL. This species feeds primarily on zooplankton. The specific name honours the leader of the expedition on which the type was collected, the oil magnate and philanthropist Captain George Allan Hancock (1875-1965).

References

External links

 

Hancocki
Western Central American coastal fauna
Fish of Costa Rica
Fish of Panama
Hancock's blenny
Taxa named by Earl Desmond Reid